Ronald B. Sieloff (born May 30, 1944) is an American politician in the state of Minnesota. He served in the Minnesota House of Representatives and Minnesota Senate.

References

1944 births
Living people
People from Thief River Falls, Minnesota
William Mitchell College of Law alumni
Minnesota lawyers
Republican Party members of the Minnesota House of Representatives
Republican Party Minnesota state senators